Sabah Hatim  (born 1 July 1950) is a former Iraqi football forward who played for Iraq in the 1972 AFC Asian Cup. He played for Iraq between 1971 and 1975.

He was part of the team that played their first World Cup qualifiers in 1974, and even scored an hattrick against New Zealand.

Career statistics

International goals
Scores and results list Iraq's goal tally first.

References

External links
https://twitter.com/hassaninmubarak

Iraqi footballers
Iraq international footballers
1972 AFC Asian Cup players
Al-Shorta SC players
Association football forwards
1950 births
Living people